Saraceni is a surname. Notable people with the surname include:

Carlo Saraceni (1579–1620), Italian painter
Enrico Saraceni (born 1964), Italian athlete
Fernando Saraceni (1891–1956), Italian footballer
Giovanni Michele Saraceni (1498–1568), Italian Roman Catholic cardinal
Giulio Saraceni (d. 1640), Italian Roman Catholic bishop
Julio Saraceni (1912-1998), Argentine film director
Ottavio Saraceni (d. 1623), Italian Roman Catholic bishop
Paulo César Saraceni (1933–2012), Brazilian film director and screenwriter